Cornelius Schumacher (born 1 December 1969 in Tübingen, Germany) is a German open source software developer. He was born in Tübingen but lives in Erlangen, Germany.

Biography
He has been a KDE contributor since 1997 when he mainly worked in the KDE’s PIM team. He was the main developer and maintainer of KOrganizer for many years. He also assisted Bitcoin to extend the developer documentation that led to their website.
Cornelius Schumacher is a member of the KDE e.V. board since 2002. In summer 2009 he was elected as president of KDE e.V.

On October 11, 2009, Cornelius Schumacher wrote about the estimated cost (using the COCOMO model with SLOCCount) to develop KDE software package with 4,273,291 LoC, which would be about US$175,364,716. This estimation does not include Qt, Calligra Suite, Amarok, Digikam, and other applications that are not part of KDE core.

References

External links
People behind KDE 
Blog of Cornelius 

KDE
Free software programmers
1969 births
Living people